G-130 (GP-130, 2-Phenyl-5,5-dimethyltetrahydro-1,4-oxazine) is a drug with stimulant and anorectic effects, related to phenmetrazine.

Structural analogs 
Compounds related to G-130 and radafaxine were synthesized that behave as combined inhibitors of monoamine uptake and nicotinic acetylcholine receptors.

Synthesis

Ex 1: 2 moles of 2-methyl-2-aminopropanol (aminomethyl propanol) (1) is reacted with 1 moles of styrene oxide (phenyloxirane) [96-09-3] (2) in 0.2 mole water. 

Ex 2: Fepradinol [36981-91-6] [63075-47-8] (3) is treated with acid, to cyclize to the morpholine ring.

See also
 2-Phenyl-3,6-dimethylmorpholine
 3-Fluorophenmetrazine
 4-Methylphenmetrazine
 Phendimetrazine
 Manifaxine

References

Stimulants
Phenylmorpholines
Designer drugs